Tom Baumgart (born 12 November 1997) is a German professional footballer who plays as a forward for  club Erzgebirge Aue.

Career
Born in Freiberg, Baumgart played for SV Mulda and Chemnitzer FC before, in June 2018, Baumgart signed for Erzgebirge Aue. In November 2019, Baumgart extended his contract with Erzgebirge Aue by a further two years.

Career statistics

References

External links
 

Living people
1997 births
Sportspeople from Freiberg
German footballers
Footballers from Saxony
Association football forwards
2. Bundesliga players
3. Liga players
Chemnitzer FC players
FC Erzgebirge Aue players
21st-century German people